Bally Sports Oklahoma is an American regional sports network owned by Diamond Sports Group (a joint-venture between Sinclair Broadcast Group and Entertainment Studios), and operates as an affiliate of Bally Sports. The channel provides statewide coverage of sports events within the state of Oklahoma, namely the Oklahoma City Thunder, the state's major college sports teams, and high school sports.
Bally Sports Oklahoma is available on cable providers throughout Oklahoma, and nationwide on satellite via DirecTV.

Background

Fox Sports Oklahoma (FSOK) launched on October 29, 2008, as a spinoff of Fox Sports Southwest. It was created in order to serve as the cable broadcaster of the Oklahoma City Thunder, after Fox Sports Southwest acquired the broadcast rights to the NBA franchise following its relocation to Oklahoma City that year from Seattle.

It initially split the rights to Thunder game telecasts with independent station KSBI (channel 52, now a MyNetworkTV affiliate), under an agreement in which Fox Sports Oklahoma would produce a limited schedule of regular-season games (most of which aired on weekends) for the station; the Thunder signed a new multi-year broadcast agreement with Fox Sports Oklahoma on August 3, 2010, rendering the team's games cable-exclusive beginning with the 2010-11 season.

On December 14, 2017, as part of a merger between both companies, The Walt Disney Company announced plans to acquire all 22 regional Fox Sports networks from 21st Century Fox, including Fox Sports Oklahoma. However, on June 27, 2018, the Justice Department ordered their divestment under antitrust grounds, citing Disney's ownership of ESPN. On May 3, 2019, Sinclair Broadcast Group and Entertainment Studios (through their joint venture, Diamond Holdings) bought Fox Sports Networks from The Walt Disney Company for $10.6 billion. The deal closed on August 22, 2019, thus placing Fox Sports Oklahoma in common ownership with Sinclair stations KOKH-TV/KOCB in the network's homebase of Oklahoma City, and KTUL in Tulsa. It was subsequently renamed Bally Sports Oklahoma on March 31, 2021.

On March 14, 2023, Diamond Sports filed for Chapter 11 Bankruptcy.

Programming
In addition to holding the regional television rights to Thunder's regular season and any early-round playoff games, Bally Sports Oklahoma also broadcasts sporting events from the Oklahoma Sooners, including football, basketball, The channel also holds exclusive broadcast rights to state football, basketball and baseball championships held by the Oklahoma Secondary School Activities Association. Bally Sports Oklahoma has broadcast Class A-6A Football Championship games and periodically runs OSSAA Championship Spotlight, a magazine program that highlights various high school sports depending on the time of year.

Bally Sports Oklahoma also broadcasts pre-game and post-game shows for the Oklahoma City Thunder (under the Thunder Live banner), and Oklahoma Sooners-related programs (such as coaches' shows and team magazine programs). Outside of programming exclusive to Bally Sports Oklahoma, the channel runs various programs supplied by Bally Sports Southwest (including sports interview, magazine and analysis programs focusing on Texas sports) as well as some game telecasts including Texas Rangers baseball and Dallas Stars hockey.

From 2012 to 2022, it held tier 3 rights to the Oklahoma Sooners of the Big 12 Conference under the Sooner Sports TV branding, which gave it rights to one football game per-season, four men's basketball games per-season, and other selected athletics events. The football game was not aired on the channel itself, but distributed via pay-per-view—an arrangement that proved controversial among fans. In 2022, the team signed with ESPN+, which holds the tier 3 rights to all other Big 12 teams (besides the Texas Longhorns, which have a separate deal with ESPN to run the regional sports network Longhorn Network).

Other services

Bally Sports Oklahoma Extra
Bally Sports Oklahoma Extra is an alternate feed of Bally Sports Oklahoma used to broadcast select events within the designated market that cannot air on the main feed due to scheduling conflicts.

Bally Sports Oklahoma Extra primarily serves an overflow feed in the event that teams whose games Bally Sports Oklahoma has the right to broadcast play conflicting games simultaneously, mainly those that are televised on Bally Sports Southwest that may otherwise also air on Bally Sports Oklahoma (such as Texas Ranger Baseball or Dallas Star Hockey) are scheduled to be held at the same time as the scheduled telecast of a Thunder or Sooners game, or a high school or collegiate sporting event involving an Oklahoma team.

On some cable systems in Oklahoma, Bally Sports Oklahoma Extra airs St. Louis Cardinals telecasts from Bally Sports Midwest and select Kansas City Royals telecasts from Bally Sports Kansas City to the fans of those teams living in Oklahoma who otherwise cannot receive Cardinals or Royals games on Bally Sports Midwest and Bally Sports Kansas City. In extremely rare times, telecasts from the 2 teams can possibly also air on Bally Sports Oklahoma as well depending on the schedule. Bally Sports Oklahoma Extra also carries select Dallas Mavericks telecasts from Bally Sports Southwest except in the immediate Oklahoma City area.

On-air staff

Current
 Chris Fisher – Thunder play-by-play
 Michael Cage – Thunder color commentator
 Nick Gallo - Thunder Sideline Reporter 
 Paris Lawson - Thunder Sideline Reporter
 John Rhadigan – Thunder Live studio host 
 Nancy Lieberman – Thunder Live studio analyst

References

External links
 www.ballysports.com/southwest – Bally Sports Southwest official website

Television channels and stations established in 2008
Companies that filed for Chapter 11 bankruptcy in 2023
Fox Sports Networks
2008 establishments in Oklahoma
Bally Sports